Miklós Kovács is a Hungarian car designer, notable for leading the design team of the model Kia Cee'd in Frankfurt, Germany.

He graduated in 1995 in Pforzheim, Germany as an automotive designer. Before working for Kia, Kovács worked for Audi.

References

Hungarian automobile designers
Living people
Year of birth missing (living people)